Mary Geraldine Guinness (25 December 1862 – 6 June 1949), often known as Mrs. Howard Taylor, was a British Protestant Christian missionary to China, and author of many missionary biographies on the history of the China Inland Mission (CIM).

Life
She was born in 1865. She was the daughter of revivalist preachers and authors Fanny Grattan Guinness and Henry Grattan Guinness. Her father was a friend of James Hudson Taylor, founder of the CIM. She became Taylor's daughter-in-law when she married his son, fellow CIM missionary Frederick Howard Taylor.

Single woman and missionary

In her youth, Taylor taught a Bible class for "factory-girls" in Bromley-by-Bow in the East End of London where they lived. She attended meetings at "Berger Hall" named after William Thomas Berger.

She left London for China as a second-class passenger on the P&O vessel Kaisar-i-Hind I in January, 1888, age 22. The Hundred missionaries had all sailed to China the previous year. Among the 25 passengers (16 men, 5 ladies [sic]) aboard the steam ship with her were Miss Mary Reed (daughter of Mrs Henry Reed and sister of Mrs Harry Guinness), Mr and Mrs Hunt (travelling to Hanchung) and the Pigott family of The Sheo Yang Mission (who were eventually killed during the Boxer Rebellion).

As recorded in In the Far East (1889), the Kaisar-i-Hind took a route passing Gibraltar (10:30pm, 31 January 1888), calling at Naples and then passing the Straits of Messina, stopping for a day at Aden and then onward to Colombo, Ceylon.

At Colombo the missionary party boarded the P&O vessel S.S. Deccan, bound for Shanghai. A stop in Penang, Malaysia, allowed Geraldine a first contact with many Chinese who came on board. Then a stop at Singapore followed. Her first time on Chinese soil was later at a stop at Hong Kong where she was received by Dr and Mrs Chalmers of the London Missionary Society, who introduced them also to Mr and Mrs Bender of the Basel Mission. Shanghai was reached next. But Shanghai was not their final destination. Staying only long enough to exchange their European clothes for the national Chinese costume, the missionaries started on again, leaving this first station of the China Inland Mission behind them and travelling on the boat Fuh-ho ("Happy Harmony") in the substantially cheaper Chinese accommodations up the Yang-tsi River to Chinkiang. Lastly on to a barge some 6 hours to Yang-chau, finally arriving at Yang-chau on 23 March 1888.

She wrote to her sister after a short time in China: 

After training in China, Geraldine was eventually stationed in Honan Province.

Published works
 The Call of China's Great North West - Kansu and Beyond (1920)
In the Far East (1889)
The Story of the China Inland Mission (1893)
 One of China's Scholars: The Early Life and Conversion of Pastor Hsi  (1900)
Guinness of Honan (1930)
Borden of Yale '09 (1913)
 Hudson Taylor In Early Years; The Growth of a Soul (1911)
Hudson Taylor and the China Inland Mission; The Growth of a Work of God (1918)
Though War Should Rise (1914)
Pearl's Secret 
The Call of China's Great North-West or Kansu and Beyond (1923)
With P’u and His Brigands (1922)
 Hudson Taylor's Spiritual Secret (1932)
Faith's Venture (1932)
Margaret King’s Vision (1934)
The Triumph of John and Betty Stam (1935)
By Faith: Henry W. Frost and the China Inland Mission (1938)
Sirs, Be of Good Cheer (1941)
A Story Without End
Behind the Ranges: Fraser of Lisuland (1944)

References

Citations

Sources

Further reading

External links
 Hudson Taylor in Early Years-The Growth of a Soul - Volume 1 by Dr. and Mrs Howard Taylor
 Christian Biography Resources
 Missionary E-Texts Archive: Historical Writings by, about and for Missionaries
 Hudson Taylor in Early Years-The Growth of a Soul - Volume 1
 Taylor family tree

1865 births
1949 deaths
Christian writers
19th-century English historians
English Protestant missionaries
Protestant missionaries in China
British expatriates in China
Geraldine Taylor
Female Christian missionaries
Clergy from Liverpool
Geraldine
British women historians
20th-century English historians